László Prukner (born 14 November 1960 in Dunaújváros) is a Hungarian football manager and former player, formerly managing Ferencvárosi TC, where he was in charge from 2010 to 2011. Prukner previously managed Kaposvári Rákóczi FC.

Career

Playing career 
He started his career in the Dunaújvárosi Kohász and he played for three years in the Hungarian First Division. He spent 2 years in Pécsi EAC, then 5 years in Kaposvári Rákóczi FC. He spent 2 years in Austria in the SK Altheim and he finished his career in Hungary.

Coaching career

Kaposvári Rákoczi FC 
He started his coaching career in Kaposvár, where he managed the local team Kaposvári Rákóczi FC in 2003. He managed to spend six years at the club which was quite unusual that time.

Ferencvárosi TC 
In 2010, he became the manager of the Budapest team Ferencvárosi TC. In the last round Ferencváros were competing with Zalaegerszegi TE and Debreceni VSC for the third position of the Hungarian Championship. Ferencváros beat Lombard-Pápa TFC 3–0 in the Albert Stadion, therefore Ferencváros finished third. Ferencváros beat Armenian Ulisses in the first round of the UEFA Europa League 2011-12 season. In the second round of the Europa League Ferencvaros beat 2-1 the Norwegian Aalesunds FK at the Albert Stadion but lost 2-1 in Ålesund, Norway. In the extra time Aalesunds scored a goal in the 109th minute and Ferencváros said farewell to the Europa League. In August 2011 he resigned from his position after an unsuccessful start in the Hungarian League and the early farewell from the Europa League.

Zalaegerszeg
In September 2011 he was appointed as the manager of Zalaegerszeg after János Csank resigned from his position due to an unsuccessful start in the Hungarian League. Prukner had to debut at the Albert Stadion against his former team Ferencváros. Prukner lost his first match by 2-0.

Managerial stats

References

1960 births
Living people
Hungarian people of German descent
Sportspeople from Dunaújváros
Hungarian footballers
Hungarian football managers
Ferencvárosi TC managers
Zalaegerszegi TE managers
Association footballers not categorized by position
Nemzeti Bajnokság I managers